Happy Eater was a chain of restaurants in England and Wales. Founded by Sir Michael Pickard in 1973, the chain wanted to compete against the British roadside restaurant category killer at the time, Little Chef, who would end up absorbing it in 1997.

History

In 1973, a former managing director of the hotel group Trust House Forte, Michael Pickard, founded a family-orientated roadside restaurant, aimed at competing with the established pre-eminent chain in the industry, Little Chef. The company's first major move was converting Welcome Break restaurants into Happy Eater locations in the 1970s. The restaurants offered similar fare to Little Chef, such as offering English breakfasts and fish and chips. A distinctive difference to customers between the two chains was that Happy Eater provided outdoor animal-themed playground equipment for children. Outlets were mostly located in the Midlands and the South East of England, with many locations situated along the A1 road corridor.

In 1980, the brand further expanded when its 21 locations were sold to the Imperial Group. Not long after this, a partnership with Esso garages was formed, which saw a rapid increase of new roadside locations throughout the 1980s. Imperial Group would expand the chain to 75 restaurants, before selling the chain in 1986 to Trust House Forte, who owned the Little Chef chain. Trust House Forte continued to expand the Happy Eater chain alongside Little Chef. The chain notably received media attention in 1991 when Prime Minister John Major stopped at a Happy Eater outlet for a fried breakfast on his way to a Young Conservatives conference.

Decline 
In 1996, Granada purchased Forte, as it had become known, and began to streamline their business by converting the Happy Eater locations to the Little Chef brand. By the end of 1997, all Happy Eater restaurants were either converted or closed, helping Little Chef reach its peak of 439 restaurants. This would prove challenging for Little Chef, as some Happy Eater locations were originally built to compete with Little Chef, meaning now the restaurants were competing with themselves; this ultimately meant Little Chef would close locations throughout the 2000s as a result of falling profits. Little Chef's financial difficulties caused it to eventually cease in January 2018. The defunct Happy Eater brand is currently owned by Kuwaiti firm Kout Food Group, who were the last organisation to operate Little Chef. The group left the United Kingdom in 2020, meaning the Happy Eater trademark is now registered in Kuwait.

Legacy 
The 1986 film, Mona Lisa, features a scene filmed in a Happy Eater. The 1989 video game Fast Food, was originally intended as a promotional tool for Happy Eater. The 2007 film Rise of the Footsoldier uses a location depicting the former Basildon branch of Happy Eater, set in the late 1980s. The 2020 Amazon series Truth Seekers features an abandoned Happy Eater restaurant in its fifth episode.

In November 2022, Loungers announced they were launching Brightside Roadside to fill the gap in the market created by the demise of Little Chef and Happy Eater.

See also
Little Chef
Brightside Roadside

References

External links

Defunct restaurants in the United Kingdom
Defunct restaurant chains
Restaurants established in 1973
British companies established in 1973
British companies disestablished in 1997
1997 disestablishments in England
1973 establishments in England
Restaurants disestablished in 1997